A post-anesthesia care unit, often abbreviated PACU and sometimes referred to as post-anesthesia recovery or PAR, or simply Recovery, is a vital part of hospitals, ambulatory care centers, and other medical facilities. Patients who received general anesthesia, regional anesthesia, or local anesthesia are transferred from the operating room suites to the recovery area. The patients are monitored typically by anesthesiologists, certified registered nurse anesthetists, and other medical staff. Providers follow a standardized handoff to the medical PACU staff that includes, which medications were given in the operating room suites, how hemodynamics were during the procedures, and what is expected for their recovery. After initial assessment and stabilization, patients are monitored for any potential complications, until the patient is transferred back to their hospital rooms.

Initial handoff 
The initial handoff, or otherwise referred as handover, is an interdisciplinary transfer of essential and critical patient information from one healthcare provider to another. Variations do exist depending on certain hospitals, medical facilities, and patient presentations. The most common information includes:

 Patient Name and Date of Birth
 Allergies, Past Medical History, Relevant Home Medications
 Operating Room Course:
 Preoperative medications received
 Access for medications (IV lines, Gauges used, Locations)
 Anesthetics Type
 Airway, Relaxant, Reversal
 Antibiotics, Analgesics, Antiemetics Administered
 Other Medications
 Fluids administered and volume status
 Any Complications or concerns
 Relevant information specific for patient's case for PACU staff to monitor
 Specific recommendations for the post-anesthesia plan of care

Monitoring 

As the patient remains in the PACU, the following are consistently monitored by medical professionals:

 Vital signs (Heart Rate, Blood Pressure, Temperature, and Respiratory Rate)
 Electrocardiogram
 Saturation of Oxygen (SpO2)
 Airway Patency
 Mental Status
 Neuromuscular Function
 Postoperative pain
 Surgical sites for excessive bleeding, mucopurulent discharge, swelling, hematomas, wound healing, and infection

Vital signs are obtained every 5 minutes for the first 15 minutes. The PACU staff monitor that the Respiratory Rate and Saturation of Oxygen remain as close to baseline of that patient while the heart rate and blood pressure remain within 20% of their baseline values. 

More intensive care monitoring may include:
 Preparation and education for the use of patient-controlled analgesia (PCA) units for postoperative pain control
 Preparation and administration of intravenous, epidural, or perineural infusions
 Invasive monitoring such as arterial lines, central venous lines, and ventriculostomies

Postoperative complications 
Depending on the use of inhalation anesthestics, post operative nausea and vomiting (PONV) is one of the most common complications to monitor in the immediate postoperative period. Patients do receive antiemetic medications, such as Ondansetron and Dexamethasone, during the surgical procedure if the patient is at risk for it. Along with PONV, there are numerous complications that can happen with many different organ systems, the most threatening of which involves the respiratory system, and cardiovascular system.

Respiratory system/airway complications 
Risk Factors are factored into account to assess for complications during the preoperative assessment. Some factors include preexisting factors such as chronic obstructive pulmonary disease (COPD), asthma, obstructive sleep apnea (OSA), obesity, heart failure, and pulmonary hypertension. 

Clinical signs and symptoms are assessed to indicate any respiratory system complications, such as Tachypnea (RR > 20 breaths/min), Bradypnea (RR < 12 breaths/min), SpO2 <93%, Anxiety, Confusion, or Agitation with resulting Tachycardia and Hypertension. 

The life-threatening complications that are monitored in PACU include:

 Laryngospasm
 Respiratory arrest
 Airway Edema
 Foreign Body
 Cervical Hematoma
 Bronchospasm
 Pulmonary Edema
 Tension Pneumothorax
 Pulmonary Embolism
 Atelectasis

Cardiovascular system complications 
Cardiovascular complications such as arrhythmias and hemodynamic Instability are the third most common postoperative complication. The risk factors that are assessed preoperatively include the severity of any preexisting cardiovascular comorbidities, such as congestive heart failure, valvular heart disease, and myocardial infarctions. The medical professional also assesses if the patient has had any recent traumas and the severity of perioperative stresses such as blood loss, fluid shifts, and hypotension. 

Clinical signs and symptoms are assessed to indicate any cardiovascular system complications, specifically hemodynamic instability and vital signs.

Hypotension 
Patients who undergo major procedures that deal with volume status perioperatively can be at risk for hypotension due to fluid shifts or significant bleeding. Hemoglobin is measured and monitored if significant bleeding could have occurred. Treatment includes either replacement of the lost blood products as pRBC, or with crystalloid solutions while monitoring electrolyte abnormalities in Lactated Ringers Solution, Normal Saline, or Crystalloid. Patients can also experience life-threatening hypotensive shock due to hemorrhage, sepsis, cardiogenic, or anaphylactic.

See also 

 Anesthesia
 Anesthesiologist
 Intensive care unit
 Nurse anesthetist
 Operating department practitioner
 Anesthetic technician
 Aldrete's scoring system

References

Further reading

External links 
 Ketamine: Emergency Applications(eMedicine.com) - discusses laryngospasm.

Hospital departments
Anesthesia